The Tusheti National Park in eastern Georgia is one of the eight new protected areas approved by Parliament of Georgia on 22 April 2003.

The Global Environment Facility (GEF) and the World Bank were part of this approval process under the "Georgia – Protected Areas Development Project". Plants conserved in the park are pine groves (Pinus sosnowskyi) and birch groves (Betula litwinowii and Betula raddeana).

The Tusheti Protected Areas includes Tusheti National Park, Tusheti Protected Landscape and Tusheti Strict Nature Reserve with total protected area about 113,660.2 ha.

The key faunal species in the park are the Anatolian leopard (Panthera pardus ambornii), bear, chamois, falcon, golden eagle, lammergeyer, lynx, wild goat and wolf. The park was named one of the "12 best places you’ve never heard of" by BudgetTravel in 2011 not only for its rich biodiversity but also for its aesthetic terrain, hamlets, old defense towers, cuisine, and folk culture.

Location
The park is set in the Tusheti Mountainous region in the north-eastern part of the country. Omalo-Alvani highway of  length is in a hilly terrain and is difficult to drive. Its ecoregion is that of the Caucasus mixed forests.

Features
The main functions of the park administration are to provide protection and conserve the flora and fauna of the park concurrently supporting the interests of the 50 nomadic communities, and achieving conservation of the linked historic monuments; and also to encourage eco-tourism.

For the endangered wild goat (Capra aegagrus) the park is the only intact habitat. To protect this species from poaching and enable its viewing in the park by visitors, the Centre for Biodiversity Conservation & Research (NACRES), an IUCN member, carried out a pilot project titled "viewing potential" by monitoring the "risks and benefits to conservation and the cost of setting up and operation of wildlife viewing trails." The local partners associated with this study were Tusheti Guide and Friends of Tusheti Protected Areas. A wild goat monitoring scheme was established, and local guides, park rangers and local groups were trained to ensure protection to the wild goat. The project has proved successful as more visitors could view the goat now, and NACRES is continuing its support.

Fauna 
In Tusheti National Park, there are seven mammals, ten birds and one fish which are on the Georgia Red List. 
Mammals are represented by otter, brown bear, wild goat, tur, deer and barbastelle. Birds, including some rare species, are common in the park. They include the imperial eagle, greater spotted eagle, lesser kestrel, corncrake, steppe eagle, black kite, vulture, Montagu's harrier, Caucasian grouse and Caucasian snowcock. Trout is the only one species of fish on the list.

Gallery

See also
Lagodekhi Protected Areas
Tusheti Strict Nature Reserve
Tusheti Protected Landscape
Omalo Ethnographic Museum

References

National parks of Georgia (country)
Protected areas established in 2003
Geography of Kakheti
Tourist attractions in Kakheti
2003 establishments in Georgia (country)